Janson is a group of serif typefaces.

Janson may also refer to:

Janson (name), a surname and uncommon given name
Janson Design Group, an American acoustic and audiovisual architectural design firm
Janson metro station, a railway station in Charleroi, Belgium
Lycée Janson de Sailly, a school in Paris, France
Saint-Estève-Janson, a commune in Bouches-du-Rhône, France
Talbot v. Janson, a 1795 U.S. Supreme Court case

See also
 Jansen (disambiguation)
 Jansons (surname)
 Janssen (disambiguation)
 Janssens, a surname
 Jansson, a surname
 Jensen (disambiguation)
 Jenson (disambiguation)